Zion Evrony is a retired Israeli diplomat, formerly serving as Israel's ambassador to Ireland and the Holy See.

Biography 
Evrony was born in Tehran, Iran. Shortly after his birth his family migrated to the recently formed Israeli state, where he lived in a Ma'abarot camp. He later studied at the Hebrew University in Jerusalem. He holds a Bachelor of Arts in Sociology and Political Science, a Masters in Business Administration and a Ph.D. in International relations.

Evrony serves as an Associate Professor in the Center for Jewish Civilization at Georgetown University.  In addition he serves as adjunct professor at the Catholic University of America and Howard University. He was previously a visiting lecturer at Tel Aviv University and the Hebrew University of Jerusalem.

References 

Ambassadors of Israel to the Holy See

Year of birth missing (living people)
Living people
Ambassadors of Israel to Ireland
People from Tehran
Iranian emigrants to Israel